The Rev. Matthew Foster Heyd is an American clergyman currently serving as rector of the Church of the Heavenly Rest in New York City. In 2022 he was elected bishop co-adjutor in the Episcopal Diocese of New York.

Education and career
Heyd studied at the University of North Carolina at Chapel Hill, Yale University and the General Theological Seminary, receiving Master's degrees in arts and religion in 1995 and sacred theology in 2009.

He was ordained in 2009 by the Rt. Rev. Mark Sisk, Bishop of New York, and served at Trinity Church on Wall Street, Manhattan, until being called as rector of the Church of the Heavenly Rest on the Upper East Side of Manhattan in 2013.

On 3 December 2022, at a special election convention of the Diocese of New York at the Cathedral of St John the Divine, Heyd was declared bishop co-adjutor after four rounds of voting. He will be consecrated as bishop co-adjutor on 20 May 2023 and will succeed the Rt. Rev. Andrew M. L. Dietsche as Bishop of New York on the latter's retirement in 2024.

Heyd is a board member of the Absalom Jones Center for Racial Healing and of Episcopal Divinity School.

Family
Heyd is married to Ann Thornton, vice-provost and librarian at Columbia University in New York City. They have one daughter and one son.

References

Living people
University of North Carolina at Chapel Hill alumni
Yale University alumni
General Theological Seminary alumni
Episcopal bishops of New York
Year of birth missing (living people)